Koffikro is a village in south-eastern Ivory Coast. It is in the sub-prefecture of Adaou, Aboisso Department, Sud-Comoé Region, Comoé District.

Until 2012, Koffikro was in the commune of Ahigbé-Koffikro, named after Koffikro and the nearby village of Ahigbé. In March 2012, Ahigbé-Koffikro became one of 1126 communes nationwide that were abolished.

Notes

Populated places in Comoé District
Populated places in Sud-Comoé